Macrocheles perglaber is a species of mite in the family Macrochelidae. It is found in New Zealand.

References

perglaber
Articles created by Qbugbot
Animals described in 1962